The National Council of Hindu Temples (NCHTUK) is an umbrella body of Hindu temples (mandirs) in the United Kingdom. It connects a network of over 200 temples in the country. It supports the temples, their management, employees and operations in order to enable public access to some of the oldest heritage sites of Hinduism. NCHTUK is also involved in areas of interfaith dialogue at forums like The Interfaith Network UK.

History 
It was established in July 1978,

In 2013, NCHTUK announced the formation of the British Board of Hindu Scholars in order to provide an alternative, authoritative, scholarly source for Indology studies. In December, Sharma represented the council during the Ambassadors reception where he presented Prince William a copy of the ancient Indian epic of Valmiki Ramayana on behalf of the council.

In May 2016, NCHTUK and HFB were requested by DCLG for improving the crematorium provisions in line with the Hindu traditions for cremating the dead. Later in December, the council protested the issue of £5 notes by Bank of England that contained tallow (a form of animal fat). Several temples across UK refused to accept the £5 currency as donations. NHCHT secretary Pt. Satish Sharma explained this was against the ethos of Hindu dharmic perspective and that printing currency and using substances derived from acts of violence upon vulnerable, non-aggressive creatures was not the behaviour of civilised beings. The organization was at the forefront of opposing an overreaching legislation by the UK parliament on caste discrimination in 2018.

Celebrations 
In August 2021, there were simultaneous prayers held across 150 temples as NCHTUK marked the laying of the foundation stone of the Ram mandir at Ayodhya.

References

Further reading

External links

Hindu organisations based in the United Kingdom
1978 establishments in the United Kingdom
Religious organizations established in 1978